Army Group A (Heeresgruppe A) was the name of several German army groups during World War II. During the Battle of France, Army Group A was composed of 45½ divisions, including 7 panzer divisions. It was responsible for breaking through the heavily-forested Ardennes region. The operation, which was part of Fall Gelb (Case Yellow), was resoundingly successful for the Germans, as the army group outflanked the best troops of France and its allies, eventually leading to France's surrender.

In 1942, Army Group South on the Eastern Front against the Soviet Union was split into Army Group A and Army Group B, and Army Group A was responsible for the invasion into the Caucasus. In 1945, months before the fall of Nazi Germany, Army Group A was renamed Army Group Centre.

Western Front, 1940
During the German invasion of the Low Countries and France, Army Group A was under the command of Generaloberst Gerd von Rundstedt and was responsible for the break-out through the Ardennes.  It was composed of 45½ divisions, including the 7 panzer divisions of Panzer Group Kleist.

Order of battle
  4th Army Generaloberst Günther von Kluge
  V Army Corps General der Infanterie Richard Ruoff
  211th Infantry Division - Generalmajor Kurt Renner
  251st Infantry Division - Generalmajor Hans Kratzert
  263rd Infantry Division - Generalmajor Franz Karl
  VIII Army Corps General der Infanterie Walter Heitz
  8th Infantry Division Generalleutnant Rudolf Koch-Erpach
  28th Infantry Division Generalmajor Johann Sinnhuber
 II Army Corps General der Infanterie Adolf Strauss
  12th Infantry Division Generalleutnant Walther von Seydlitz-Kurzbach
  32nd Infantry Division Generalleutnant Franz Böhme
 XV Army Corps General der Infanterie Hermann Hoth
  5th Panzer Division Generalleutnant Joachim Lemelsen
  7th Panzer Division Generalmajor Erwin Rommel
  62nd Infantry Division Generalmajor Walter Keiner
12th Army Generaloberst Wilhelm List
  VI Army Corps General der Pioniere Otto-Wilhelm Förster
 III Army Corps General der Artillerie Curt Haase
  XVII Army Corps General der Infanterie Werner Kienitz
  16th Army General der Infanterie Ernst Busch
 VII Army Corps General der Infanterie Eugen Ritter von Schobert
 XIII Army Corps General der Panzertruppe Heinrich von Vietingoff
 XXIII Army Corps Generalleutnant Albrecht Schubert
 Panzer Group Kleist
 XIX Army Corps General der Panzertruppe Heinz Guderian
  2nd Panzer Division Generalleutnant Rudolf Veiel
  1st Panzer Division Generalleutnant Fredrich Kirchner
  10th Panzer Division Generalleutnant Ferdinand Schaal
  Infantry Regiment Großdeutschland
  XLI Army Corps Generalleutnant Georg-Hans Reinhardt
  6th Panzer Division Generalmajor Werner Kempf
  8th Panzer Division Generalleutnant Adolf-Friedrich Kuntzen
  2nd Infantry Division Generalleutnant Paul Bader
 XIV Army Corps General der Infanterie Gustav Anton von Wietersheim
  13th Panzer Division Generalmajor Friedrich-Wilhelm von Rothkirch und Panthen
  29th Motorized Infantry Division Generalmajor Willibald von Langermann und Erlencamp
 Reserves
 XXXX Corps - Generalleutnant Georg Stumme
  4th Infantry Division Generalleutnant Erick-Oskar Hansen
  87th Infantry Division Generalleutnant Bogislav von Studnitz
  211th Infantry Division Generalleutnant Kurt Renner
  263rd Infantry Division Generalleutnant Franz Karl
  267th Infantry Division Generalleutnant Ernst Feßmann

Eastern Front, 1942
In 1942, Army Group South was in southern Russia on the Eastern Front.  For Case Blue (Fall Blau), the summer offensive of the Wehrmacht, Army Group South was split into Army Group A and Army Group B. Army Group A was ordered south to capture the oil fields in the Caucasus.

Army Group A included the following armies:  
  1st Panzer Army
 11th Army
 17th Army
 Romanian 3rd Army

Eastern Front, 1944-1945
Army Group A was formed a third time on September 23, 1944, in southern Poland and the Carpathian region by renaming Army Group North Ukraine. The army group was used to defend southern Poland and Slovakia. 

Subordinate were: 
  9th Army 
 4th Panzer Army
 17th Army
  1st Panzer Army

After the breakthrough of the Red Army near Baranow on the Vistula during the Soviet Vistula-Oder Offensive, on January 16, 1945 Colonel Bogislaw von Bonin, the Chief of the Operational Branch of the Army General Staff (Generalstab des Heeres) gave Heeresgruppe A permission to retreat rejecting a direct order from Adolf Hitler for them to hold fast. Although Heeresgruppe A escaped encirclement and regrouped, von Bonin was arrested by the Gestapo on January 19, 1945, and imprisoned.

On 25 January 1945 Hitler renamed three army groups. Army Group North became Army Group Courland, Army Group Centre became Army Group North, and Army Group A became Army Group Centre.

Commanders

Chiefs of staff

References

Army groups of the German Army in World War II
Military units and formations established in 1940
Military units and formations disestablished in 1945